The Tampa Baseball Museum is a museum in the Ybor City neighborhood of Tampa, Florida. Located in the rehabilitated childhood home of Al López, Tampa's first Major League player, manager, and Hall of Fame Inductee, the museum includes exhibits to commemorate the city's baseball heritage.

The house was moved from its original location at 1210 E 12th Ave to the museum dedicated location at the corner of 19th Street and Ninth Avenue. The Tampa Baseball Museum is located at 2003 N. 19th Street.

References

External links
 Tampa Baseball Museum

Baseball in Florida
Sports in Tampa, Florida